Tadeusz Iwaniec (born October 9, 1947 in Elbląg) is a Polish-American mathematician, and since 1996 John Raymond French Distinguished Professor of Mathematics at Syracuse University.

He and mathematician Henryk Iwaniec are twin brothers.

Awards and honors
Iwaniec was given the Prize of the President of the Polish Academy of Sciences, 1980, the Alfred Jurzykowski Award in Mathematics in 1997, the Prix 2001 Institut Henri-Poincaré Gauthier-Villars, and the 2009 Sierpinski Medal of the Polish Mathematical Society and Warsaw University. In 1998 he was elected as a foreign member of the Academia di Scienze Fisiche e Matematiche, Italy  and in 2012 as a foreign member of the Finnish Academy of Science and Letters.

References

Polish mathematicians
21st-century American mathematicians
Polish emigrants to the United States
People from Elbląg
Polish twins
1947 births
Living people
Syracuse University faculty
Mathematicians from New York (state)
20th-century American mathematicians